"Capua" naias is a species of moth of the family Tortricidae. It is found in Australia, where it has been recorded from New South Wales.

The wingspan is about 12 mm. The forewings are white with blackish markings. The hindwings are pale-grey.

Taxonomy
The species does not belong in the genus Capua and should be placed in a new genus.

References

Moths described in 1916
Archipini